is a historical Japanese capital city, which was located in present-day central Osaka city.

Traces of ancient palaces in Naniwa were found in 1957. Through more recent excavations, the existence of a city was confirmed, at least for the latter period in the 8th century.

References

External links 
 Osaka City Cultural Properties Association (Japanese)

Former capitals of Japan
Nara period